Antotohazo, Andramasina - Antotohazo, a village in the district of Andramasina, Analamanga, Madagascar
Antotohazo - Antotohazo, a village in the district of Ankazobe, Analamanga, Madagascar
there is also a village with the same name, Antotohazo near Fianarantsoa.